Ruffman is a surname. Notable people with the surname include:

Ruff Ruffman of FETCH! with Ruff Ruffman
Mag Ruffman (born 1957), Canadian comedian, actress and television host

See also
Raffman
Ruffian (disambiguation)
Ruffin (disambiguation)